Solontsovsky is a rural locality (a khutor) and the administrative center of Solontsovskoye Rural Settlement, Alexeyevsky District, Volgograd Oblast, Russia. The population was 560 as of 2010.

Geography 
Solontsovsky is located 24 km southeast of Alexeyevskaya (the district's administrative centre) by road. Yaminsky is the nearest rural locality.

References 

Rural localities in Alexeyevsky District, Volgograd Oblast